"The Best Things in Life Are Free" is a popular song written by the songwriting team of Buddy DeSylva and Lew Brown (lyrics) and Ray Henderson (music) for the 1927 musical Good News. It enjoyed a revival during the period from 1947 to 1950, when it was covered by many artists.

On January 1, 2023, the composition entered the public domain in the US.

Lyrics 
There are so many kinds of riches,
And only one of them is gold.
Though wealth you miss,
Remember this :
Worthwhile things cannot be bought or sold.
Refrain
The moon belongs to everyone—
The best things in life are free
The stars belong to everyone
They gleam there for you and me
The flowers in spring
the robins that sing
The sunbeams that shine
They're yours!—They're mine!
And love can come to everyone—
The best things in life are free

Recordings 
The song first enjoyed chart success in 1927 with the recordings by George Olsen and Frank Black.

Jo Stafford recorded the song on November 7, 1947, bringing the song to a new genre. She enjoyed chart success with the song reaching the No. 21 spot in 1948. Dinah Shore also covered the song in 1948; her single reached peaked at No. 18 on the charts.

Other recordings
The Ink Spots covered the song in 1947; their version reached #10 on the Billboard U.S. R&B chart.
Kay Starr recorded the song in 1947 and it was included in the album The Uncollected Kay Starr in the 1940s - 1947.
Les Paul and Mary Ford (1954)
Michael Holliday for his album Happy Holliday (1961)
Gordon MacRae (1956)
Sonny Stitt (1957) in his album Sonny Stitt with the New Yorkers
Saxophonist Hank Mobley played the song on the 1961 album Workout.
Sam Cooke sang the song on the 1964 live album Sam Cooke at the Copa.
Saxophonist Lou Donaldson played the song on the 1970 live album Fried Buzzard.
Bing Crosby included the song on his 1975 album That's What Life Is All About.
Victoria Jackson on her children's album, Ukulele Lady
Michael Feinstein included the song in the album Romance on Film, Romance on Broadway (2000)

In film and television
The song was included in both film adaptations of Good News, in 1930 and 1947; the 1947 film featured the song several times, sung by June Allyson, Mel Tormé, and Peter Lawford.

The film The Best Things in Life Are Free (1956), about DeSylva, Brown and Henderson, was named after the song and featured it with a version sung by Sheree North (dubbed by Eileen Wilson).

In an episode of The Muppet Show, a group of kleptomaniac prairie dogs sang the song as they looted the set.                                                                                        

The song was sung by Bonnie Bedelia in the 1969 Sydney Pollack film They Shoot Horses, Don't They?

Robert Morse performed the song in the Mad Men (season 7) episode "Waterloo" (May 25, 2014), in a dream sequence.

Also featured in the film Nanny McPhee Returns during the piglet feeding in the beginning of the movie. Sung by Bing Crosby.

Sam Cooke's version of the song is used in the closing of the Season 2 finale (episode 7) of The White Lotus.

References

1927 songs
Songs from musicals
Songs with music by Ray Henderson
Songs with lyrics by Buddy DeSylva
Songs with lyrics by Lew Brown